Live from London is a digital EP by Australian pop singer Natalie Imbruglia, available exclusively through the iTunes Store as part of the Live from London series. It was released on 17 August 2007, through Brightside Recordings.

The EP contains five live acoustic versions of hits from her singles collection Glorious: The Singles 1997-2007.

Track listing

References

Natalie Imbruglia albums
2007 debut EPs
Live EPs
2007 live albums
iTunes Live from London (Natalie Imbruglia EP)